Joshua Mallett (born December 10, 1981), also known by his stage name "Rip", is an American recording artist, producer, DJ, and filmmaker from Waukegan, Illinois. Rip has been selected as a "Famous Waukeganite" by the City of Waukegan. In 2018 he was considered for four Grammy Awards and was the first billed hip-hop set to perform the Grand stage at The World's Largest Brat Fest on May 26, 2018.

Career
Rip's career started early when he created "Rip Records", an independent record label while in high school. In 2002, he released "In The Lab 1.0" followed by "Coming Up In The Game" in 2003. At an early age, the Recording Industry Association of America (RIAA) and Atlantic Records awarded him a Platinum Plaque in 2003 for his activities in the music industry. After a decade of musical activities in the Midwest, Rip relocated in Madison, Wisconsin. He released his debut solo album "Fashionably Late" in June 2010. This album was co-produced by DJ Pain 1 with contribution of childhood friend Justin Mentell. Its single "Watchin Me" wain radios across U.S.oss U.S. Rip's "Sellout" album was released in 2012 by Island Def Jam including its single "Kissin In The Dark", a collaborative effort with country singer Augie Zibell. In November 2013, Rip won five Madison Hip-Hop Awards including artist, song, video, and videographer of the year. In the same month, he released on DVD "The Making of a Sellout", a feature film documentary about Rip's life and career. In 2014, Rip released his film "Giddy Up" at the Sundance Cinema in Madison, WI. In 2016, Rip initiated his album "Trinity", a defining moment in his musical career. Trinity focuses on his religious beliefs, struggles, addictions and obstacles he faced his entire life. It is also a tribute to his "Savior" Jesus Christ.

The week of April 8, 2018, Rip's single "Drown" was #1 in rotation on 97x FM-WIXL in Madison, WI.

In May 2019, Rip debuted "Jolene" live at The World's Largest Brat Fest and announced he's working on his fourth studio album, Delivered, which is due out in 2020.  He officially released "Jolene" as a single on November 1, 2019.

In August 2019, he headlined his first international show, Urban Fest, in La Ceiba, Honduras.

Works

Discography

Filmography

References

External links
 
 
  Rip official website
  Rip on Spotify

1981 births
Living people
People from Waukegan, Illinois
Musicians from Madison, Wisconsin
Rappers from Wisconsin
American male rappers
American DJs
Film producers from Illinois
Film producers from Wisconsin
Midwest hip hop musicians
21st-century American rappers
Christian hip hop
American music video directors
Record producers from Illinois
Songwriters from Illinois
American performers of Christian hip hop music
21st-century American male musicians
American male songwriters